"Rambling Rose" is a popular song.

The music was written by Joe Burke, the lyrics by Joseph McCarthy. The song was published in 1947.

Recordings
The song was recorded by Perry Como on December 30, 1947. The recording was released by RCA Victor as catalog number 20-2947, with the flip side "There Must Be A Way." The recording spent 14 weeks on the Billboard chart, beginning July 23, 1948, peaking at position #18. The record was also released in the United Kingdom by HMV as catalog number BD-1211, with the flip side "Laroo Laroo Lilli Bolero."

The song was also recorded by Gordon MacRae on July 23, 1948. The recording was released by Capitol Records as catalog number 15178. The recording spent one week (October 15) on the Billboard chart, at position #27. George Paxton and his Orchestra also recorded the song; a photograph of Paxton is featured on the song's sheet music published in 1948.

References

Songs with lyrics by Joseph McCarthy (lyricist)
1947 songs
1948 songs
Songs with music by Joe Burke (composer)